FGFR1 oncogene partner is a protein that in humans is encoded by the FGFR1OP gene.

Function 

This gene encodes a largely hydrophilic protein postulated to be a leucine-rich protein family member. A t(6;8)(q27;p11) chromosomal translocation, fusing this gene and the fibroblast growth factor receptor 1 (FGFR1) gene, has been found in cases of myeloproliferative disorder. The resulting chimeric protein contains the N-terminal leucine-rich region of this encoded protein fused to the catalytic domain of FGFR1. This gene is thought to play an important role in normal proliferation and differentiation of the erythroid lineage. Alternatively spliced transcript variants that encode different proteins have been identified.

References

Further reading

External links